Phrissomini is a tribe of longhorn beetles of the subfamily Lamiinae. It was described by Thomson in 1860.

Taxonomy
 Brimidius Breuning, 1936
 Brimopsis Breuning, 1942
 Brimus Pascoe, 1862
 Echinovelleda Breuning, 1936
 Granulhepomidion Breuning, 1958
 Hayashiechthistatus Miyake, 1980
 Hepomidion Thomson, 1878
 Herophila Mulsant, 1863
 Macrospina Mateu, 1957
 Megalobrimus Aurivillius, 1916
 Mesechthistatus Breuning, 1950
 Mimechthistatus Breuning, 1956
 Morimospasma Ganglbauer, 1890
 Morimus Audinet-Serville, 1835
 Neophrissoma Breuning, 1938
 Neotrachystola Breuning, 1942
 Oriaethus Pascoe, 1864
 Parabrimidius Breuning, 1938
 Parabrimus Breuning, 1936
 Parahepomidion Breuning, 1936
 Paravelleda Breuning, 1936
 Parechthistatus Breuning, 1942
 Phrissoma Laporte de Castenau, 1840
 Phrissomorimus Breuning & Itzinger, 1943
 Pseudoechthistatus Pic, 1917
 Pseudostixis Breuning, 1936
 Pseudovelleda Breuning, 1936
 Setovelleda Breuning, 1961
 Spinospasma Breuning, 1970
 Spinovelleda Breuning, 1942
 Stixis Gahan, 1890
 Strandiata Breuning, 1936
 Trichostixis Breuning, 1936
 Velleda Thomson, 1858
 Velledopsis Breuning, 1936

References